LaShell Renee Griffin (born January 14, 1968 as LaShell Renee Thomas) is an American gospel musician. Her first album, Free, was released by Epic Records in 2004. This was a Billboard magazine breakthrough release upon four charts, The Billboard 200, Gospel Albums, R&B Albums, and Heatseekers Albums. She released two more subsequent albums, but they have not placed on any charts.

Early life
Griffin was born on January 14, 1968, as LaShell Renee Thomas, to mother Geraldine, whose maiden name was Mundy, and she won Oprah Winfrey's singing competition, Pop Star Challenge. This got her a record deal with Epic Records.

Music career
Her music recording career commenced in 2004, with the album, Free, and it was released by Epic Records on May 25, 2004. The album was her breakthrough release upon four Billboard magazine charts, and it placed on The Billboard 200 at No. 166, Gospel Albums at No. 2, R&B Albums at No. 43, and Heatseekers Albums at No. 5. While she has released two more albums, they have failed to gain any commercial traction or achieve any national exposure.

Personal life
Griffin and her now deceased former husband, LeVoties Griffin, has five children together, and she still resides with them in Detroit, Michigan.

Discography

References

External links
 Cross Rhythms artist profile

1968 births
Living people
African-American songwriters
African-American Christians
Musicians from Detroit
Songwriters from Michigan
Epic Records artists
21st-century African-American people
20th-century African-American people